Mujer de todos, Mujer de nadie (English: Everybody's Woman, Nobody's Woman) is the fourth studio album by Mexican pop singer Daniela Romo. This album was released in 1986 and it was her most successful album released in the 1980s, with the song De Mi Enamórate spending 14 weeks at #1 at the Hot Latin Tracks of Billboard, a record at the time.

History
This album was released by the successful 1980s production team of Miguel Blasco, J.R. Florez and Gian Pietro Felisatti. It includes several songs written by Daniela. The album contains the song "Me alimento de tí" (You nourish me) written by Gonzalo Benavides and performed with Mijares. It also includes one of her greatest songs ever, the track "De mí enamórate" (Fall in love with me), the main theme from El Camino Secreto.

Track listing
Tracks:
 De mí enamórate
 Veneno para dos
 No no le creas
 Coco loco
 Me alimento de ti (Duet with Mijares)
 Ayer pensé
 Confesiones
 Adelante corazón
 La batalla del amor
 Mujer de todos, mujer de nadie
 Bastará
 El mundo acabará

Singles
 Coco loco
 Veneno para dos
 Me alimento de ti
 De mí enamórate

Singles charts

Album chart
This release reached the #2 position in Billboard Latin Pop Albums.

References

1986 albums
Daniela Romo albums